Dichagyris herculea is a moth of the family Noctuidae. It is found in Afghanistan, Pakistan, India, Tibet, and Nepal.

It was first described as a form of Rhyacia flammatra (which is now Dichagyris flammatra), Rhyacia flammatra f. herculea.

References 

herculea
Moths described in 1933